John Thomas Brown (April 2, 1918 – November 24, 1969) was an American tenor saxophonist of the Chicago blues era. He was variously billed as Saxman Brown, J. T. (Big Boy) Brown, Bep Brown, Nature Boy Brown and J.T. "Blow It" Brown.

Biography
Born John Thomas Brown in Mississippi, he was a member of the Rabbit's Foot Minstrels and spent some time in Memphis, Tennessee, before moving to Chicago. He worked as a session musician for several artists and made some records on Harlem and United, among other labels, in the 1950s. "Round House Boogie" / "Kickin' the Blues Around", "Sax-ony Boogie", and "Dumb Woman Blues" were issued under various band names by Meteor Records in this period.

Brown later played and recorded with Elmore James and Howlin Wolf. He also recorded as a leader for several independent record labels, including JOB and United. He appeared on several tracks of Fleetwood Mac's 1969 album Fleetwood Mac in Chicago/Blues Jam in Chicago, Vols. 1–2, on which he sang his own composition, "Black Jack Blues".

He died in Chicago in November 1969, at the age of 51. He was interred at the Burr Oak Cemetery, in Worth, Illinois.

On May 14, 2011, the fourth annual White Lake Blues Festival took place at the Howmet Playhouse Theater in Whitehall, Michigan. The concert was organized by executive producer Steve Salter, of the nonprofit organization Killer Blues, to raise money to honor Brown's unmarked grave with a headstone. The event was a success, and a headstone was placed in June 2011.

Discography

As bandleader
Windy City Boogie (Pearl [1977])

Compilation
The Chronological J.T. Brown 1950-54 (Classics [2005])

With Fleetwood Mac, Otis Spann, Willie Dixon, Big Walter Horton, Buddy Guy, Honeyboy Edwards and S.P. Leary
Blues Jam in Chicago Vol. One (Blue Horizon [1969])
Blues Jam at Chess (Blue Horizon [1969])

With Fleetwood Mac, Otis Spann, Willie Dixon, Buddy Guy, Honeyboy Edwards and S.P. Leary
Blues Jam in Chicago Vol. Two (Blue Horizon [1970])

With Howlin' Wolf
The Real Folk Blues (Chess, 1956-64 [1965])

See also
List of Chicago blues musicians
List of electric blues musicians

References

1918 births
1969 deaths
American blues saxophonists
Chicago blues musicians
Blues musicians from Mississippi
People from Mississippi
20th-century American musicians
20th-century saxophonists
United Records artists
Meteor Records artists